Diimines are organic compounds containing two imine (RCH=NR') groups.  Common derivatives are 1,2-diketones and 1,3-diimines.  These compounds are used as ligands and as precursors to heterocycles.  Diimines are prepared by condensation reactions where a dialdehyde or diketone is treated with amine and water is eliminated.  Similar methods are used to prepare Schiff bases and oximes.

1,2-Diimines

The 1,2-diketimine ligands also called α-diimines and 1,4-diazabutadienes. They are derived from the condensation of 1,2-diketones and glyoxal with amines, often anilines. 

An example is glyoxal-bis(mesitylimine), a yellow solid that is synthesized by condensation of 2,4,6-trimethylaniline and glyoxal.  2,2'-Bipyridine is a 1,2-diimine.

1,2-Diketimines are “non-innocent ligands”, akin to the dithiolenes.

1,3-Diimines
For example, acetylacetone (2,4-pentanedione) and a primary alkyl- or arylamine will react, typically in acidified ethanol, to form a diketimine.  
1,3-Diketimines are often referred to as HNacNac, a modification of the abbreviation Hacac for the conjugate acid of acetylacetone. These species form bidentate anionic ligands.

Uses
Substituted α-diimine ligands are useful in the preparation of post-metallocene catalysts for the polymerization and copolymerization of ethylene and alkenes.

Diimines are precursors to NHC ligands by condensation with formaldehyde.

References

Imines
Ligands